The Mauritania men's national under-18 basketball team is a national basketball team of Mauritania, administered by the Fédération de Basketball de la République Islamique de Mauritanie.

It represents the country in international under-18 (under age 18) basketball competitions.

See also
Mauritania men's national basketball team

References

External links
Mauritania Basketball Records at FIBA Archive

U-18
Men's national under-18 basketball teams